The 2018 ITTF Women's World Cup was a table tennis competition held in Chengdu, China, from 28 to 30 September 2018. It was the 22nd edition of the ITTF-sanctioned event, and the ninth time that it has been staged in China.

In the final, China's Ding Ning defeated fellow Chinese player Zhu Yuling, 4–0, to win her third World Cup title.

Qualification

In total, 20 players qualified for the World Cup:
 The current World Champion
 18 players from the five Continental Cups held during 2018
 A wild card, selected by the ITTF
A maximum of two players from each association could qualify.

Notes

Competition format

The tournament consisted of two stages: a preliminary group stage and a knockout stage. The players seeded 9 to 20 were drawn into four groups, with three players in each group. The top two players from each group then joined the top eight seeded players in the second stage of the competition, which consisted of a knockout draw.

Seeding

The seeding list was based on the official ITTF world ranking for September 2018.

Preliminary stage

The preliminary group stage took place on 28 September, with the top two players in each group progressing to the main draw.

Main draw

The knockout stage took place from 29 to 30 September.

See also
2018 World Team Table Tennis Championships
2018 ITTF World Tour
2018 ITTF World Tour Grand Finals
2018 ITTF Men's World Cup
2018 ITTF Team World Cup

References

External links
 Tournament page on ITTF website

Women
World Cup (women)
World Cup (women)
Table tennis competitions in China
International sports competitions hosted by China
ITTF Women's World Cup
ITTF Women's World Cup